Choltice is a market town in Pardubice District in the Pardubice Region of the Czech Republic. It has about 1,200 inhabitants.

Administrative parts
Villages of Ledec and Podhorky are administrative parts of Choltice.

Notable people
Josef Vojtěch Hellich (1807–1880), painter and archaeologist
Olga Richterová (born 1985), politician; grew up here

References

External links

 

Populated places in Pardubice District
Market towns in the Czech Republic